The 1976 African Cup of Nations was the tenth edition of the Africa Cup of Nations, the soccer championship of Africa (CAF). It was hosted by Ethiopia. The format of competition changed from 1974: the field of eight teams was still split into two groups of four, but a final stage was introduced with the top two finishers of each of the first stage groups. Morocco won its first championship (and only to date), by topping the final group. Guinea finished second.

Qualified teams 

The 8 qualified teams are:

 
  (host)
 
 
 
 
 
  (holders)

Squads

Venues

First round

Group A

Group B

Final round

Scorers 
4 goals
  Mamadou Aliou Keïta

3 goals

  Ahmed Faras
  Baba Otu Mohammed
  Ali Gagarin

2 goals

  Mustafa Abdou
  Taha Basri
  Solomon Sheferahu
  Abdelâali Zahraoui
  Haruna Ilerika
  Muda Lawal
  Sam Ojebode
  Thompson Usiyan
  Bengally Sylla

1 goal

  Ahmed Abou Rehab
  Hassan Shehata
  Mahmoud El Khatib
  Mohamed El-Seyagui
  Osama Khalil
  Mohamed Ali
  Tesfaye Seyoum
  Papa Camara
  Chérif Souleymane
  Petit Sory
  Morciré Sylla
  Ahmed Abouali
  Mustapha "Chérif" Fetoui
  Redouane Guezzar
  Larbi Chebbak
  Ahmed "Baba" Makrouh
  Abdallah Tazi
  Denis Obua
  Jimmy Muguwa
  Kabasu Babo
  Mbungu Ekofa
  Ndaye Mulamba

Own goal
  Ghanem Sultan (against Guinea)

CAF Team of the tournament 
Goalkeeper
  Mohammed Al-Hazaz

Defenders
  Mustapha "Chérif" Fetoui
  Mustafa Younis
  Chérif Souleymane
  Djibril Diara

Midfielders
  Tolde
  Farouk Gaafar
  Haruna Ilerika
  Kunle Awesu

Forwards
  Petit Sory
  Ahmed Faras

External links 
 Guinea vs Morocco Final 11v11.com
 Details at RSSSF
 Details at www.angelfire.com
 footballmundial.tripod.com

 
Nations
International association football competitions hosted by Ethiopia
Africa Cup of Nations tournaments
Africa Cup Of Nations, 1976
African Cup of Nations
African Cup of Nations